William Hunter Jr. (November 26, 1774December 3, 1849) was an American politician and diplomat and owner of the Hunter House, now a museum.

Life and career
Hunter was born in Newport, Rhode Island, as the youngest son of seven children of Debora Malbone Hunter and Dr. William Hunter, a prominent Newport doctor, scholar and merchant. He attended the Rogers School and graduated from the College of Rhode Island and Providence Plantations (the former name of Brown University) at Providence in 1791. In 1791 he went to England to study medicine, but when he arrived there he changed his mind and studied law. He returned to the United States in 1793 and established a law practice in Newport. He was a member of the Rhode Island General Assembly from 1799 to 1812, a member of the United States Senate from Rhode Island from 1811 to 1821, and a member of the Rhode Island House of Representatives from 1823 to 1825. Hunter had been elected by the state legislature to the United States Senate in 1811 after a senator resigned, and elected to a full term in 1814. On June 17, 1812, he was one of 13 senators who voted against declaring war against Britain.  He was a member of the United States Federalist Party in the Senate, and served as chairman of the Commerce Committee from 1815 to 1817.

Hunter was elected a member of the American Antiquarian Society in 1815.

He was a member of the Artillery Company of Newport, a militia unit to which many of Newport's leading citizens belonged.

After leaving the Senate, Hunter continued to practice law in Newport. In 1836, he was appointed by President Andrew Jackson to be the United States representative to Brazil. He served in this position for 9 years, through multiple presidents, until 1845, and then returned to Newport, where he died four years later. Hunter is buried in the Trinity Church graveyard.

Information about his political beliefs and activities while in the Senate is not easily available. One opinion that he is known for is that he believed that the state of Massachusetts was exaggerating its role in the Revolutionary War.

See also

 List of United States political appointments that crossed party lines

References

External links

 
 

|-

1774 births
1849 deaths
United States senators from Rhode Island
Ambassadors of the United States to Brazil
Brown University alumni
Members of the Rhode Island House of Representatives
Politicians from Newport, Rhode Island
Rhode Island Federalists
Federalist Party United States senators
19th-century American diplomats
Members of the American Antiquarian Society